Reuland may refer to:

Reuland (surname)
Reuland, Luxembourg, a village in Luxembourg
Burg-Reuland, a municipality in Liège, Belgium
Reuland Castle, a castle in Belgium